Console Wars is a 2020 documentary directed by Jonah Tulis and Blake J. Harris. The film is about the 1990s console wars between Nintendo and Sega in the 16-bit era and the rise and fall of Sega in the home console market. It is based on Harris's 2014 book and is the first original film for CBS All Access, now Paramount+.

Premise 
The documentary chronicles the story of how Sega stepped up to take on Nintendo during the 1990s, the console war between the two companies, and the eventual down fall of Sega during the late 90s.

Reception 
The documentary received generally favorable reviews. It currently holds  approval rating on Rotten Tomatoes based on  reviews.

See also 
 GameStop: Rise of the Players

References

Bibliography

External links 
 

2020 films
American documentary films
Paramount+ original films
2020s English-language films
2020 documentary films
1990s in video gaming
Documentary films about video games
Films scored by Jeff Beal
Legendary Pictures films
Point Grey Pictures films
Films directed by Jonah Tulis
2020s American films